Obligado is a city and district in the Itapúa Department of Paraguay. Commonly known as the Capital City of Cooperativism or Industrial Capital City of Itapúa.

History
The Argentinian Pastor Servando Obligado owned the lands that would later be Obligado. The city was founded on May 25, 1912 by German colonists who bought the ground.

It was upgraded to District in June 20, 1955.

Obligado, with Hohenau and Bella Vista, make up a cluster of districts in Itapúa called "Colonias Unidas" for their industrial work.

References
World Gazeteer: Paraguay – World-Gazetteer.com

Districts of Itapúa Department